Comanche Territory is a 1997 Spanish drama war film produced and directed by Gerardo Herrero and starring Imanol Arias, Carmelo Gómez, Cecilia Dopazo, Bruno Todeschini and Gastón Pauls. It is based on the homonymous novel by Arturo Pérez-Reverte, based on their own experiencies as war correspondent at Sarajevo during the early stages of the siege. Pérez-Reverte also co-wrote the screenplay. It was entered into the 47th Berlin International Film Festival.

Cast
 Imanol Arias as Mikel Uriarte
 Carmelo Gómez as José
 Cecilia Dopazo as Laura Riera
 Mirta Zečević as Jadranka
 Bruno Todeschini as Olivier
 Gastón Pauls as Manuel
 Natasa Lusetic as Helga
 Ecija Ojdanić as Jasmina
 Javier Dotú as Andrés
 Iñaki Guevara as Carlos
 Ivan Brkić as Francotirador

References

External links
 

1997 films
Spanish drama films
1990s Spanish-language films
1997 drama films
Films based on works by Arturo Pérez-Reverte
Films based on Spanish novels
Films directed by Gerardo Herrero
Yugoslav Wars in fiction
Journalism adapted into films
Yugoslav Wars films
Tornasol Films films
1990s Spanish films